The sixth GeGeGe no Kitarō anime adaptation. It premiered on April 1, 2018. This anime adaptation celebrates the 50th anniversary of the original 1968 anime. It is animated by Toei Animation.

Episode list

Home media

Region 2 (Japan)

Notes

References

2018